Yancheng Luzhiying Football Club are a China League Two club. They are an association football club from Yancheng, Jiangsu. The Dafeng Olympic Sports Centre is their home venue.

History
Jiangsu Yancheng Dingli F.C. was established in January 2016. The club decided to buy the first team of Fujian Broncos F.C. as well as their position in Chinese Football Association China League Two.

At the start of the 2021 China League Two season, the club changed its name to Yancheng Luzhiying.

Name history
2016–2020 Jiangsu Yancheng Dingli F.C. 江苏盐城鼎立
2021– Yancheng Luzhiying F.C. 盐城鹿之瀛

Current squad

First team
As of 24 October 2020

Reserve squad

Coaching staff

Managerial history
  Gao Fei (2016–2017)
  Wang Hongwei (2017–2018)
  Huang Yong (2019–2020)
  Tang Jing (2020)
  Fan Wenlong (2021)

Results
All-time league rankings

As of the end of 2019 season.

 In group stage.

Key
 Pld = Played
 W = Games won
 D = Games drawn
 L = Games lost
 F = Goals for
 A = Goals against
 Pts = Points
 Pos = Final position

 DNQ = Did not qualify
 DNE = Did not enter
 NH = Not Held
 – = Does Not Exist
 R1 = Round 1
 R2 = Round 2
 R3 = Round 3
 R4 = Round 4

 F = Final
 SF = Semi-finals
 QF = Quarter-finals
 R16 = Round of 16
 Group = Group stage
 GS2 = Second Group stage
 QR1 = First Qualifying Round
 QR2 = Second Qualifying Round
 QR3 = Third Qualifying Round

References

Football clubs in China
Association football clubs established in 2016
2016 establishments in China
Sport in Jiangsu